Parastenomordella flavolongevittata is a species of beetle in the genus Parastenomordella of the family Mordellidae, which is part of the superfamily Tenebrionoidea. It was described in 1950 by Ermisch.

References

Beetles described in 1950
Mordellidae